Italo Bandini (15 April 1905 – 11 December 1978) was an Italian former professional footballer who played as a winger.

In 2013, he was inducted into ACF Fiorentina Hall of Fame.

Career
He was bought from C.S. Firenze by Fiorentina to play the very first season of the newly formed club. He became the first player in the history of Fiorentina to get a red card. Baldini was sold after just one season, before being bought again in 1928.

Bandini then moved to Gruppo Sportivo Giovanni Berta in 1930 and Montevarchi in 1931.

Honours

Individual 
ACF Fiorentina Hall of Fame: 2013

References

External links
 Italo Bandini at ATF-Firenze.it

1905 births
1978 deaths
ACF Fiorentina players
Association football wingers
Italian footballers